Oyme is a folk music band from Russia, playing traditional music of the Erzya and Moksha and other Finno-Ugric peoples (and, since late 2010s, also the music of the peoples of Dagestan).

The sound of Oyme is primarily based on the polyphonic female singing (mostly in Erzya language, but other Finno-Ugric and Northeast Caucasian languages are used as well). The band members are ethnomusicologists and musicians specialising in the traditional singing techniques and traditional music instruments. A more modern, electronic kind of sound is also used on some tracks. Based on their own field trips to villages with ethnic populations, they reconstruct folk celebrations and rituals, traditional musical instruments, and national costumes. Their live performances typically evolve into an interactive ritual that involves the audience, which is a characteristic feature of Oyme.

Oyme have performed on many festivals in various countries all over the world, most notably at the Rainforest World Music Festival in 2018, and at WOMEX in 2019. Their music is also used to announce fight entrances of MMA wrestler Vladimir Mineev.

Discography 
 Shtatol (2016)

Videography 
 Oyme's Song (2015, feat. Deep Forest)
 Vaya (2017)
 Horol Ebel (2019)
 Tyushtya's Song (2020)

Also appeared on 
 Something Old, Something New... (2016) by Will Johns (featured on the track "Tears of a Butterfly")
 Evo Devo (2016) by Deep Forest (featured on the tracks "Simply Done" and "Oyme's Song")

Awards 

 The music video for "Vaya":
 KlipFEST 2017: best artistic solution (winner), best female role (winner), best music video (laureate)
 Best Russian music video of 2017 according to the Association of Music Critics of Russia
 Winner of the Unsigned Only music competition in 2019 and 2020
 The 18th Independent Music Awards (IMAs) nominee ("Yehy Vaya" feat. Serge Bulat)

Gallery

References

External links 

 Official site
 Official YouTube channel

Mordvin music
Musical groups established in 2011
Russian world music groups
Russian folk music groups
Musical groups from Moscow
Erzyas